Oidiodendron is a genus of fungi in the family Myxotrichaceae. It has 26 species. The genus was circumscribed by Norwegian forester Håkon Robak in 1932, with Oidiodendron fuscum assigned as the type species. The species is now known as Oidiodendron tenuissimum.

Species
Oidiodendron ambiguum 
Oidiodendron cereale 
Oidiodendron chlamydosporicum 
Oidiodendron echinulatum 
Oidiodendron eucalypti 
Oidiodendron fimicola 
Oidiodendron flavum 
Oidiodendron gracile 
Oidiodendron griseum 
Oidiodendron hughesii 
Oidiodendron majus 
Oidiodendron mellicola 
Oidiodendron myxotrichoides 
Oidiodendron periconioides 
Oidiodendron pilicola 
Oidiodendron ramosum 
Oidiodendron reticulatum 
Oidiodendron rhodogenum 
Oidiodendron robustum 
Oidiodendron scytaloides 
Oidiodendron setiferum 
Oidiodendron sulfureum 
Oidiodendron tenuissimum 
Oidiodendron terrestre 
Oidiodendron truncatum

References

Onygenales
Taxa described in 1932
Eurotiomycetes genera